Wyatt Hawn Russell (born July 10, 1986) is an American actor and former ice hockey player. Russell portrayed Corporal Lewis Ford in Julius Avery's 2018 horror film Overlord, Dud in AMC's Lodge 49 and John Walker in the Marvel Cinematic Universe Disney+ series The Falcon and the Winter Soldier (2021).

Early life 
Russell was born on July 10, 1986, in Los Angeles, California, to actors Kurt Russell and Goldie Hawn. He is a grandson of actor Bing Russell, and a half-brother of actors Oliver Hudson and Kate Hudson. He is of German, English, Scottish, Irish, and, from his maternal grandmother, Hungarian Jewish, descent.

Career
Russell played ice hockey for numerous amateur and pro hockey teams as a goaltender including the Richmond Sockeyes, Langley Hornets, Coquitlam Express, Chicago Steel, Brampton Capitals, and Groningen Grizzlies. He also played college ice hockey for the Chargers at the University of Alabama in Huntsville. His career was cut short from professional hockey in 2010 due to injuries.

Russell appeared in films, such as Soldier, Cowboys & Aliens, This Is 40, Love and Honor, The Last Goon Show of All, We Are What We Are, and Goon: Last of the Enforcers. He also appeared in the 2014 film 22 Jump Street. In 2016, he co-starred in a film that premiered at the Tribeca Film Festival called Folk Hero & Funny Guy. In 2016, he starred in "Playtest", an episode of the anthology series Black Mirror.

In 2018, he and Jovan Adepo played the leads in the World War II-set horror film Overlord. In 2021, he starred as John Walker in the Disney+ series The Falcon and the Winter Soldier. He will reprise the role in the 2024 film Thunderbolts.
In 2022, Russell took on the role of real-life murderer Dan Lafferty in the FX Original mini series Under the Banner of Heaven.

Upcoming projects
In July 2022, he joined his father in Apple TV+ and Legendary Television's Godzilla series, Godzilla and the Titans which is set in the world of Legendary’s MonsterVerse franchise.

Personal life
In 2012, after two years of dating, Russell married stylist Sanne Hamers, whom he met in the Netherlands while playing hockey. The couple separated in 2015 and divorced amicably in 2017. Russell began a relationship with actress Meredith Hagner in 2015, after meeting her on the set of the film Folk Hero & Funny Guy. They became engaged in 2018 and married in 2019. Their first child, a son, was born in 2021.

He was a goalkeeper for the 2022 NHL All-Star Game's break-away challenge.

Filmography

Film

Television

Awards and nominations

References

External links
 
 

1986 births
Living people
21st-century American male actors
Alabama–Huntsville Chargers men's ice hockey players
American male child actors
American male film actors
American male television actors
American men's ice hockey goaltenders
American people of Hungarian-Jewish descent
Chicago Steel players
Coquitlam Express players
Ice hockey people from Los Angeles
Langley Hornets players
Male actors from Los Angeles
Richmond Sockeyes players
American expatriate ice hockey players in Canada
American expatriate ice hockey players in Germany
American expatriate ice hockey players in the Netherlands
American people of German descent
American people of English descent